Kweisi Mfume (born Frizzell Gerald Gray; October 24, 1948) is an American politician who is the U.S. representative for Maryland's 7th congressional district, first serving from 1987 to 1996 and again since 2020. A member of the Democratic Party, Mfume first left his seat to become the president and CEO of the National Association for the Advancement of Colored People (NAACP), a position he held from 1996 to 2004. In 2006, he ran for the U.S. Senate seat being vacated by Paul Sarbanes, narrowly losing the Democratic primary to the eventual winner, Ben Cardin. Mfume returned to his former House seat in 2020 after it was left vacant by the death of Elijah Cummings.

Early life and education
Mfume was born as Frizzell Gerald Gray in Baltimore, Maryland, on October 24, 1948, the eldest of four. His father, a truck driver, abandoned his family in Gray's youth. Upon the death of his mother, Mfume dropped out of high school at 16 to begin working as many as three jobs at a time to support his three sisters. He also began hanging around on street corners, which included being in the company of gang members.

He changed his name to Kweisi Mfume in the early 1970s.

In his 1996 autobiography, No Free Ride, Mfume wrote that he "was locked up a couple of times on suspicion of theft because [he] happened to be black and happened to be young." Speculation as to the degree of his entanglement with the law has varied, especially as he later came into prominence. He fathered five children with several different women during his teenage years. He has since adopted another child.

Career

In 1978, Mfume was elected to the Baltimore City Council, where he opposed mayor William Donald Schaefer, whom he accused of ignoring the city's poor neighborhoods. He was elected to the U.S. House of Representatives in 1986.

U.S. House of Representatives (1987–1996) 

In November 1986, Mfume was elected to represent , succeeding fellow Democrat Parren Mitchell. He was reelection four times.

Mfume made himself known as a Democrat with an apparent balance between progressive ideologies and a capacity for practical compromise, representing a district that included both West Baltimore and suburban and rural communities, though his primary goal was an increase in federal aid to American inner cities. In his fourth term he was made chairman of the Congressional Black Caucus.

NAACP 

In February 1996, Mfume left the House to accept the presidency of the National Association for the Advancement of Colored People (NAACP), saying that he could do more to improve American civil rights there than in Congress. He reformed the NAACP's finances to pay off its considerable debt while pursuing the cause of civil rights advancement for African Americans. Though many in Baltimore wanted Mfume to run for mayor in the 1999 election, he stayed with the NAACP.

Mfume stepped down from the NAACP in 2004 after an internal investigation of allegations that he had sexually harassed female subordinates. He acknowledged dating an NAACP employee, and in May 2005 apologized for having had the affair while leading the organization.

The NAACP reportedly paid out $100,000 to settle Mfume's alleged improprieties.

2006 U.S. Senate campaign

On March 14, 2005, Mfume announced that he would seek the U.S. Senate seat of incumbent Paul Sarbanes, following Sarbanes's announcement that he would not seek reelection in 2006. Mfume lost the Democratic primary for this seat on September 12, 2006, to U.S. Representative Ben Cardin.

In the wake of his primary defeat, Mfume was believed to be considering running for mayor of Baltimore in 2007, though he had not publicly expressed interest in it. On November 13, 2006, Mfume told a Baltimore-area radio station, "I don't have any plans to run for mayor. She [incoming mayor Sheila Dixon]'s worked for and deserves an opportunity to lead. ... I want her to succeed. I want the city to be united. I think at this point we owe her at least the opportunity to try to lead it."

2007–2020 

In March 2010, Mfume was named chief executive officer of the National Medical Association (NMA). In late 2010, he was again rumored to be considering a run in the 2011 Baltimore mayoral election. He left the NMA in June 2011.

In May 2013, Mfume was named chair of the board of regents of his alma mater, Morgan State University. He assumed the position on July 1, 2013, succeeding the interim chair Martin Resnick.

From 2013 to 2018, Mfume was the principal investigator for the Health Policy Research Consortium.

U.S. House of Representatives (2020–present)

Elections

2020 special 

On November 4, 2019, Mfume announced his candidacy for the special election for his old congressional seat to fill the vacancy created by the October death of his successor, Elijah Cummings. On February 4, 2020, Mfume won the Democratic nomination, defeating Maya Rockeymoore Cummings, Elijah Cummings's widow. As the 7th is a heavily Democratic, black-majority district, this all but assured Mfume's return to Congress after a 24-year absence. He defeated Republican nominee Kimberly Klacik in the general election on April 28, 2020 and was sworn in on May 5.

2020 

Mfume ran for a full term in the November 2020 race and won, defeating Klacik in a rematch.

2022

Committee assignments 
In the 117th Congress Mfume serves on the following committees:
Committee on Oversight and Government Reform
Subcommittee on Civil Rights and Civil Liberties
Subcommittee on National Security
Committee on Small Business (Vice Chair)
Subcommittee on Contracting and Workforce (Chair)
Subcommittee on Oversight, Investigations and Regulations
Committee on Education and Labor
Subcommittee on Civil Rights and Human Services

Caucus memberships 
Congressional Black Caucus
Congressional Progressive Caucus
Congressional Bipartisan HBCU Caucus
Congressional Caribbean Caucus
Congressional Ukraine Caucus

Personal life
Mfume is a member of the Prince Hall Freemasons and Omega Psi Phi fraternity.

In 2012, he married Tiffany McMillan, the granddaughter of Enolia McMillan, the first female president of the NAACP.

See also
List of African-American United States representatives

References

External links

 Congressman Kweisi Mfume official U.S. House website
 Mfume for Congress campaign website

 

|-

|-

|-

|-

|-

1948 births
20th-century American politicians
21st-century American politicians
African-American city council members in Maryland
African-American members of the United States House of Representatives
African-American people in Maryland politics
American anti–Iraq War activists
American Prince Hall Freemasons
Baltimore City Council members
Candidates in the 2006 United States elections
Democratic Party members of the United States House of Representatives from Maryland
Johns Hopkins University alumni
Living people
Morgan State University alumni
NAACP activists